Aktuaalne kaamera (abbreviated AK) is an Estonian television news program shown in Eesti Televisioon. They first broadcast on March 11, 1956, which makes AK the oldest continuously running television program in Estonia.

Since October 1958, AK broadcasts every day. Earlier, it was every week.

The name "Aktuaalne kaamera" is derived from the East German television program Aktuelle Kamera.

References

External links
 Aktuaalne kaamera, ERR.ee

Mass media in Estonia
Television news shows
Eesti Televisioon original programming